Bjarte Breiteig (born 17 March 1974) is a Norwegian short story writer.

Background 
Bjarte Breiteig was born in Kristiansand, 1974. He studied physics at NTNU in Trondheim, but dropped out after two years to study literature at the same place. He has studied at the Skrivekunstakademiet and the University of Bergen. He now resides in Oslo.

Work 
Published in 1998, Bjarte Breiteig's first short story collection, Fantomsmerter, received glowing reviews and Aschehougs debutantpris. His next collection of short stories, Surrogater was published in 2000.  In 2003, Bjarte Breiteig was one of five young authors whose work was included in a collection of short stories published under the title of Borders by the European literary project Scritture Giovani. This means Breiteig's short story Fremover was translated into Welsh, German, English and Italian. He received the Anders Jahres pris for yngre kunstnere (Anders Jahre's prize for young artists) in 2004. In 2006, his third short story collection, Folk har begynt å banke på, was published and resulted in his being awarded the Max Wiel Nygaards legat (Max Wiel Nygaards Endowment). He was also awarded the Mads Wiel Nygaards Endowment in 2006.

Bibliography 
Fantomsmerter (Phantom pains), 1998
Surrogater (Surrogates), 2000
Folk har begynt å banke på (Someone is knocking at the door), 2006
Île Sainte-Marie, 2013
Mine fem år som far, 2014
Den andre viljen, 2016

External links
Breiteig, Bjarte - Official homepage  (Norwegian)
Breiteig, Bjarte - Aschehoug & co (English)
Breiteig, Bjarte - Dagbladet :litteratur (Norwegian)

Living people
1974 births
Norwegian writers
People from Kristiansand
University of Bergen alumni